Jean Marie was the name of a number of steamships, including:

, a Belgian cargo ship in service 1947–51
, a Belgian cargo ship in service 1956–62

Ship names